Xiong Zhenfeng (born 25 November 1997) is a Chinese footballer who currently plays for Segunda División B side Marbella on loan from Liaoning FC.

Club career
Xiong Zhenfeng entered the Middle School attached to Nanchang University in 2008, then transferred to Shanghai Jingwen School in 2010 and joined Shanghai Shenhua youth academy in 2013. He moved to Chinese Super League side Liaoning FC in February 2017. On 10 September 2017, he made his senior debut in a 2–0 away defeat against Chongqing Dangdai Lifan as the benefit of the new rule of the league that at least one Under-23 player must be in the starting line-up and was substituted off in the 25th minute.

On 31 January 2019, Xiong was loaned to Segunda División B side Marbella until 30 June 2020.

Career statistics

References

1997 births
Living people
Chinese footballers
Footballers from Jiangxi
People from Nanchang
Liaoning F.C. players
Marbella FC players
Chinese Super League players
China League One players
Association football defenders
Chinese expatriate footballers
Expatriate footballers in Spain
Chinese expatriate sportspeople in Spain